Parliamentary elections were held in the Free City of Danzig on 13 November 1927. The Social Democratic Party emerged as the largest party, receiving 34% of the vote and winning 42 of the 120 seats in the Volkstag. Voter turnout was 85%.

Results

References

Elections in the Free City of Danzig
Danzig
November 1927 events